Head uudised is the sixth album by Estonian rock band Terminaator, released in 2000. On the cover, band's name is written as "Termina:tor". From every sale, 1 EEK was donated to support the anti-AIDS campaign.

Track listing 

 Portselanist tüdruk [Porcelain girl] (Kreem/Kreem) - 3:09
 See ei ole saladus [It is not a secret] (Kreem/Kreem) - 3:23
Tee [The way] (Kreem/Kreem) - 4:03
 6 jalga niisket maad [6 feet of moist land] (Kreem/Kreem) - 3:37
 Just nagu mustlased [Just like gypsies] (Kreem/Kreem) - 5:04
 Head uudised [Good news] (Kreem/Kreem) - 3:31
 Raudteejaam [Railroad station] (Kreem/Liitmaa/Kreem) - 4:44
 Klaustrofoobia [Claustrophobia] (Kreem/Kreem) - 5:40
 Jää [Ice] (Kreem/Kreem) - 5:05
 Hall maailm [Grey world] (Kreem/Kreem) - 3:40
 Osa minust [Part of me] (Kreem/Kreem) - 2:16
 Veel on aega [There is still time] (Kaljulaid/Kreem) - 4:41
 Televiisorimees (live "Katusekontsert") [Televisor man (live "Roof concert")] - 8:14
 Includes a hidden track, "Kes ei tööta, see ei söö" [Who doesn't work, doesn't eat].

Song information 

 "Portselanist tüdruk" is about a man, who is warned by his mother and father for women, that won't stay by his side. He nevertheless ends up with such a girl and has to be disappointed.
 "See ei ole saladus" is kind of a love song.
 "Tee" also seems to be a love song, and its message is: "The way is important, not the destination."
 "6 jalga niisket maad" is about a highwayman, who is looking for salvation.
 "Just nagu mustlased" is about an outlaw or a mob of them.
 The message of "Head uudised" is, that there aren't any good news anymore and that the bad news have become merely an entertainment.
 "Raudteejaam" is a love song and it seems to be from the eyes of a secret admirer, who is writing love letters on the wall of a railway station.
 "Klaustrofoobia" is about a man, who falls in love with a woman and then realizes, that he's just a puppet for her.
 "Jää" is another love song about finding answers.
 "Hall maailm" is about a man who has lived through a lot.
 "Osa minust" handles the good and the bad part of a human being.
 "Veel on aega" is about leaving your home town. It also has a reference to Laura Palmer from "Twin Peaks" in lines "Laura Palmer mõrvati | Väikelinn kuid elab edasi", which means "Laura Palmer was murdered | But a small town lives on".
 "Televiisorimees" is from the album "Singapur". The band used to do concerts for free on the roof of a low porch of a building in Tallinn, that's where the term "katusekontsert" comes. It's the live version of the song from a "Katusekontsert". "Televiisorimees" ends at 3:47, "Kes ei tööta, see ei söö" starts at 4:48. "Kes ei tööta, see ei söö" is a cover of Kuldne Trio.

Personnel
Sven Valdmann - bass
Jaagup Kreem - vocals, acoustic, back
Elmar Liitmaa - guitar, acoustic, back
Eimel Kaljulaid - drums, tambourine, back, grand piano
Harmo Kallaste - synth, back

External links 
 Estmusic.com Listen to the songs.

2000 albums
Terminaator albums
Estonian-language albums